Tunjë is a village and a former municipality in the Elbasan County, central Albania. At the 2015 local government reform it became a subdivision of the municipality Gramsh. The population at the 2011 census was 1,393. The municipal unit consists of the villages Tunjë, Tunjë e Re, Duzhe, Jance Qënder, Jance Mal, Prrenjas, Irmenj, Plepas, Katerlis, Oban, Sarasel and Lubinje.

References

Former municipalities in Elbasan County
Administrative units of Gramsh, Elbasan
Villages in Elbasan County